Luuk, officially the Municipality of Luuk (Tausūg: Kawman sin Luuk), is a 3rd class municipality in the province of Sulu, Philippines. According to the 2020 census, it has a population of 37,873 people.

On July 14, 2007, 8 of its barangays were constituted into the separate municipality of Omar, Sulu.

History 
Luuk was the main site of the violent Kamlon Revolt in 1951. This municipality was once a warzone where the government forces and the Muslim rebels would engage frequently for a span of 5–7 years.

Geography

Barangays

Luuk is politically subdivided into 12 barangays.

Climate

Demographics

Economy

References

External links

Luuk Profile at PhilAtlas.com
[ Philippine Standard Geographic Code]
Luuk Profile at the DTI Cities and Municipalities Competitive Index
Philippine Census Information
Local Governance Performance Management System

Municipalities of Sulu